The following highways are numbered 788:

Canada

United States